Modern Rheumatology is the official English-language journal of Japan College of Rheumatology, published by Taylor and Francis.  It was formerly published as Japanese Journal of Rheumatology (1986-1989). 

It is indexed by services including Medline, Chemical Abstracts Service and Science Citation Index.

References 
 

Rheumatology journals